Genua may refer to:
Genua, an early name for Genoa, a city in Italy (Genua is the Latin, German and ancient Ligurian name for the city, occasionally used in English, especially in historical and archaeological contexts)
Genua, a fictional city from the Discworld novels by Terry Pratchett
485 Genua, a main belt asteroid

People with the surname
Marcantonio Genua (1491–1563), Renaissance Aristotelian philosopher

See also
Genoa (disambiguation)